Ken Gray (born 9 December 1962) is a Jamaican hurdler. He competed in the men's 400 metres hurdles at the 1984 Summer Olympics.

References

1962 births
Living people
Athletes (track and field) at the 1984 Summer Olympics
Jamaican male hurdlers
Olympic athletes of Jamaica
Place of birth missing (living people)